The 2005 season was the Detroit Lions' 76th in the National Football League (NFL) and their 82nd since moving to Detroit and becoming the Lions. The Lions failed to improve on their 6–10 record in 2004.

The Lions began their 2005 season with a 17–3 win over the rival Packers. However, the next week, the Lions were throttled, 38–6, by the Bears in Chicago. By week 10, the Lions had a 4–5 record after they had defeated the Arizona Cardinals 29–21 at home. However, the Lions lost five consecutive games following that win, and were eliminated from the playoffs with a 16–13 overtime loss to the Packers. The Lions would win one more game for the rest of the season, which was a 13–12 win over the Saints. The season concluded with a 35–21 loss to the eventual Super Bowl champion Steelers.

During the season, after the Lions lost 27–7 on Thanksgiving Day to the Atlanta Falcons, the Lions fired Steve Mariucci, and hired Dick Jauron to be the interim head coach for the remainder of the season.

Staff

Roster

Regular season

Schedule

Game summaries

Week 1

Standings

References

External links
 2005 Detroit Lions at Pro-Football-Reference.com

Detroit
Detroit Lions seasons
Detroit Lions